The Armenia national korfball team is managed by the Korfball Federation of Armenia (KFA), representing Armenia in  international korfball competitions.

Tournament history

Current squad
National team in the 2009 European Bowl

 Coach: Arman Alaberkyan, Melik Sandrosyan

See also 

 Sport in Armenia

References

External links
 Korfball Federation of Armenia

National korfball teams
Korfball
Korfball in Armenia